Maclyn S. (MacyLyn) Goldman (December 11, 1901 – November 18, 1977) was an American Democratic Party politician, lawyer and businessman.  He represented Essex County in the New Jersey State Senate from 1966 to 1968. Goldman served as a Municipal Court Judge in West Orange, New Jersey and as the long time West Orange Democratic Municipal Chairman.  He was the Essex County Treasurer.  He was elected State Senator in 1965, but lost his bid for re-election in 1967 to Republican James Wallwork. He was a graduate of New York University and Rutgers Law School.

Personal life

Irving B. Goldman, President of the American Academy of Facial Plastic and Reconstructive Surgery, is his brother.

1965 Essex County State Senator General Election Results

References

1901 births
1977 deaths
New Jersey Democrats